DeJon "D.J." Gomes (born November 17, 1989) is a former American football safety. He was drafted in the fifth round of the 2011 NFL Draft by the Washington Redskins. Gomes played college football for the University of Nebraska–Lincoln.

He was also a member of the Detroit Lions.

High school career
Dejon Gomes attended high school at James Logan High School in Union City, California where he started for one year on the varsity football team, after sitting out the previous year with an injury. After graduating in 2007, he did not receive any top scholarship offers, so he decided to attend City College of San Francisco.

College career

While at the City College of San Francisco, Gomes lead the state in interceptions, tackles, and fumble returns. Later on, Gomes transferred to Nebraska. Once Gomes started his career at Nebraska, he quickly became a starter for two years and lead the team in interceptions and tackles. He was billed as one of the top defensive back prospects for the 2011 NFL Draft by many NFL Draft experts and analysts.

Professional career

2011 NFL Combine

Washington Redskins

2011 season
Gomes was drafted by the Washington Redskins 146th overall in the 2011 NFL Draft, joining college teammates, Roy Helu, who was drafted earlier in the fourth round, and Niles Paul, who was drafted after him. Throughout the season, he played as the backup to both free safety, Oshiomogho Atogwe, and strong safety, LaRon Landry, splitting the responsibility with Reed Doughty.
Gomes made his NFL debut in Week 1 against the New York Giants. He then had his first career start as a free safety in Week 11 against the Dallas Cowboys, where he made 14 tackles.
After Landry was put on injured reserve, Gomes became the starting strong safety for the rest of the season.
On December 24, 2011, while playing against the Minnesota Vikings, Gomes tackled Adrian Peterson which resulted in Peterson tearing his ACL and MCL.
Gomes finished the 2011 season playing 15 games, starting five of them, and recording 35 tackles and two pass breakups.

2012 season
By the start of the 2012 season, Gomes was made the starting strong safety in place of an injured Brandon Meriweather. In the season opener win against the New Orleans Saints, he recorded his first pass deflection and first interception on Drew Brees. By Week 4 of the 2012 season, he lost the starting strong safety position to Reed Doughty. After Meriweather was placed on injured reserve, Gomes was made the starting strong safety again in the Week 12 win against the Dallas Cowboys, where he recovered a fumble after Josh Wilson stripped the ball and recorded six tackles.

2013 season
Gomes was waived during the final roster cuts before the start of the 2013 season on August 31, 2013.

Detroit Lions

2013 season
Gomes was claimed off waivers by the Detroit Lions on September 1, 2013.

2014 season
On August 26, 2014, the Lions placed Gomes on injured reserve due to a neck and shoulder injury he suffered in the second preseason game against the Oakland Raiders when he took on a helmet-to-helmet collision with Raiders tight end Scott Simonson. Three days later, the Lions released him off injured reserve with an injury settlement.

References

External links
 
 Detroit Lions bio
 Nebraska Cornhuskers bio

1989 births
Living people
American football safeties
City College of San Francisco Rams football players
Nebraska Cornhuskers football players
Washington Redskins players
Detroit Lions players
Players of American football from California
Sportspeople from Hayward, California